Kerry Micks (born January 10, 1961) is a Canadian race car driver in the NASCAR Pinty's Series.

CASCAR Super Series

Kerry and his wife Susan formed Micks Motorsports in 1992 to compete in the CASCAR Super Series. From 1990 to 2006 he drove in CASCAR, where is the all-time leader in starts with 165 and second in wins with 24 in the series. Micks won his first and only CASCAR Super Series Championship in 1993.

Micks was the first Canadian driver to race a Ford when Ford of Canada came on board for the CASCAR Super Series in 1995.

NASCAR Canadian Tire Series
After NASCAR completed their buyout of CASCAR in 2007, Micks began to race in the NASCAR Canadian Tire Series. He has had 3 wins: Montreal and Trois-Rivières (2007); Mosport Park (2008) as well as 4 poles Barrie (2007); Montreal (2008), Autodrome St-Eustache (2010), Mosport Park (2013). In 2009 he had little success, but in 2010 things looked promising he lost on the last lap to D. J. Kennington after winning the pole and leading most of the laps in July at Autodrome St-Eustache and had 6 top fives finishing 4th in the final point standings.

In 2012 Micks stopped competing full-time on the Canadian Tire circuit, splitting the races with fellow veteran driver and 1994 CASCAR Champion Mark Dilley. Micks raced the road courses in the No. 02, while Dilley raced the oval circuits, other than one oval at Riverside International Speedway, entering the team's road course car renumbered as 56. Micks retired from the race after just 4 laps, giving him his only DNF on the season.

Micks continued his part-time schedule in 2013, racing 6 races for Micks Motorsports, while adding an additional two races in the No. 98 Ford owned by Canadian NASCAR pioneer Jim Bray. Micks did not finish 4 of his races entered in 2013, including both in Bray's cars. Micks substituted for Dilley at the oval at Canadian Tire Motorsport Park, surprising the field by winning the pole and leading 86 laps before dropping out with ignition failure.

For the third season in a row, Micks split 2014 driving duties with Mark Dilley. Micks again entered his road course car into two oval races, at Riverside and Barrie Speedway, this time numbered as the 9. Micks entered a Dodge at Barrie, making it one of the only times in Micks career he would race something other than a Ford.

Motorsports career results

NASCAR
(key) (Bold – Pole position awarded by qualifying time. Italics – Pole position earned by points standings or practice time. * – Most laps led.)

Busch Series

Pinty's Series

 Season still in progress
 Ineligible for series points

References

External links
 
Team Website
Nascar Driver Page

Racing drivers from Ontario
NASCAR drivers
Living people
1961 births
People from East Gwillimbury
CASCAR Super Series drivers